NKU Soccer Stadium is a soccer stadium located in Highland Heights, Kentucky. The stadium is home to the Northern Kentucky Norse men's and women's soccer teams, as well as MLS Next Pro side FC Cincinnati 2.

References 

Soccer venues in Kentucky
Northern Kentucky Norse soccer
Buildings and structures in Campbell County, Kentucky
2009 establishments in Kentucky
Sports venues completed in 2009
College soccer venues in the United States
FC Cincinnati